Stuart Gibbs (born June 11, 1969) is an American author who has written mostly mystery and humor books that are aimed for tweens and teens. 

Gibbs' books have been described as "fun, fast-paced." and "entertaining". He has written six book series: the FunJungle series, the Moon Base Alpha series, the Spy School series, the Charlie Thorne series, the Last Musketeer and Once Upon a Tim. He also wrote a Batman comic called Bruce Wayne: Not Super. Gibbs wrote screenplays for Showdown (1993), See Spot Run (2001), and Repli-Kate (2002).

Personal life
Gibbs was born in 1969 in Philadelphia, Pennsylvania, moved to Washington, D.C. at five, and moved to San Antonio, Texas, when he was seven. He attended the University of Pennsylvania.

Books

FunJungle series 
The FunJungle series is about a boy named Theodore (Teddy) Fitzroy who lives with his family in the largest zoo in America, the (fictional) titular FunJungle. Teddy and his friends solve various mysteries that occur around the zoo, trying to watch out for people that will make his life harder, such as Marge O'Malley, a security guard, and the ever dubious billionaire owner of FunJungle, J.J. McCracken. As the series progresses, Teddy becomes friends with, and later starts dating, J.J.'s daughter Summer McCracken. Currently, Teddy has solved seven mysteries that revolve around a main zoo animal who is in danger.

 Belly Up (2010) Henry, a hippo and FunJungle’s mascot, dies.
 Poached (2014) A koala goes missing from FunJungle.
 Big Game (2015) A pregnant rhino that lives in FunJungle is shot at.
 Panda-monium (2017)
 Lion Down (2019)
 Tyrannosaurus Wrecks (2020) A Tyrannosaurus Rex skull disappears.
 Bear Bottom (2021) Taking place in and near Yellowstone National Park, Teddy investigates a lost necklace and missing bison.
 ‘’Whale Done’’ (2023) After Teddy's house burns down, he goes with Summer and Candance to Malibu and investigates a dead whale.

Spy School series 
In the Spy School Series, twelve-year-old Benjamin "Ben" Ripley gets recruited to the top-secret CIA academy of espionage. He has several successful missions against the evil spy organization SPYDER with fellow spy Erica Hale.

Books:

 Spy School (2012) Benjamin Ripley, a thirteen-year-old, is recruited initially as "bait" to catch a "mole" at the D.C. CIA Academy of Espionage, but ends up becoming a real spy due to his satisfactory achievement in his mission, where he stopped a bomb from exploding and killing top espionage leaders.
 Spy Camp (2013) In the second book in the series, Ben attends the CIA's 'summer camp' version of spy school. He meets his friend, Erica Hale,'s grandfather, Cyrus Hale, who was a highly successful spy in his early days and was still a top spy. SPYDER tries to recruit Benjamin, but he turns them down, escapes with Erica and Cyrus, and foils their evil plans again, stopping them from nuking Camp David. They also expose Erica's father, Alexander, as a fraud.
 Evil Spy School (2015) After being expelled from the CIA's top-secret spy school, Ben enrolls in SPYDER's espionage academy, because Erica urges him, at their headquarters. He meets two new students there that might be able to save missiles from destroying bridges (and he has to make sure he doesn't fall in love with one of them). Joshua Hallal tricks him into doing complex mathematical problems to plan the missile strike on New York City. Later, he is saved from SPYDER by Erica and Cyrus and stops the missiles from hitting New York, but one is redirected to SPYDER's headquarters and Ben is nearly killed.
 Spy Ski School (2016) In the fourth book in the series, Ben, Erica, Cyrus, and several other students at the academy are sent to a ski resort in Vail, Colorado to keep tabs on Leo Shang, a Chinese billionaire who is at the resort. Ben befriends Shang's daughter, Jessica, and Erica reveals the affection she has for Ben that she has hidden under her icy personality. Ben finds out Shang's plan and stops a nuclear bomb from destroying a good part of Colorado. Ben also reveals to his best friend Mike that he is a spy.
 Spy School Secret Service (2017) After being assigned to befriend the President of the United States' son, Ben is planted with a bomb by SPYDER in an attempt to blow up the Oval Office and is framed for the explosion. He becomes a wanted criminal, but with help from Erica, Cyrus, and other Spy School students, they stop SPYDER from threatening the rest of the world with the USA's nuclear arsenal for money.
 Spy School Goes South (2018) In this book, Ben and Erica are sent to Aquarius, a beach resort on the Yucatan Peninsula, to follow SPYDER agent Murray Hill as he leads them to SPYDER's new headquarters. They find SPYDER is planning to nuke Antarctica, causing a rapid speed-up of global warming. Together Ben and Erica foil their plans and imprison some of their operatives. Ben is faced with the decision of if he wants to be with Zoe or Erica.
 Spy School British Invasion (2019) Taking place right after Spy School Goes South, Ben, Mike, Zoe, Alexander, and Erica, along with Erica's mom, Catherine Hale (who is in MI6), follow a lead-taking them to Mr. E, the supreme leader of SPYDER, in Paris, France. They figure out SPYDER's final plan and prevent it from taking place, as well as capture Mr. E, who turns out to be a former CIA operative, defeating SPYDER for good. 
 Spy School Revolution (2020) After Erica appears to have switched sides, Ben is the only one who believes she is truly innocent, which pits him against his friends. Ben fights a centuries-old secret evil organization called the Croatoan as he tries to prove Erica's innocence and stop the Croatoan. 
 Spy School at Sea (2021) Ben, Mike, Erica, Catherine, and Alexander are sent to Nicaragua to find out what Murray Hill is up to. They pose as a family on a luxury cruise as they search for Murray.
 Spy School the Graphic Novel (2022) Spy School novel one adapted into a graphic novel.
Spy School Project X (2022) Ben is forced to run as assassins and conspirators try to kill him; his goal is to capture Murray Hill. He has to fight off assassins and find where Murray Hill is to call off the hit. But Murray doubled down and posted on a website called The Truth and told conspiracy theorists that Ben was trying to take over the government.

Moon Base Alpha series 
The MBA series takes place in 2041 where 12 year old Dashiell Gibson and his family are recruited to go to Moon Base Alpha, the first human lunar colony. In each book, Dashiell (nicknamed Dash) investigates dangerous occurrences.

 Space Case (2014) Dr. Ronald Holtz, a scientist at MBA, mysteriously dies on the lunar surface. Dash and Kira attempt to uncover the killer and send them home on the next rocket back to Earth.
 Spaced Out (2016) The base commander, Nina Stack, goes missing.
 Waste of Space (2018) Lars Sjoberg, a trillionaire lunar tourist, is poisoned.

The Last Musketeer series 
The Last Musketeer series is about a boy named Greg who goes back in time to the time of the Three Musketeers to save his parents. Along the way, he completes other quests and adventures with the Three Musketeers: Athos, Porthos, and Aramis.
 The Last Musketeer (2011)
 Traitor's Chase (2012)
 Double Cross (2013)

Charlie Thorne series 
The Charlie Thorne series is centered around a 12-year-old genius named Charlie Thorne, who competes against various adversaries to find dangerous discoveries hidden by distinguished individuals throughout history.

 Charlie Thorne and the Last Equation (2019) Charlie travels around the world to find Albert Einstein's last equation, Pandora. 
 Charlie Thorne and the Lost City (2021) Charlie adventures to South America in search of Charles Darwin's lost treasure.  
 Charlie Thorne and the Curse of Cleopatra (2022) Charlie explores ancient ruins across the world as she races to find Cleopatra's mysterious treasure.

Once Upon A Tim series 
This series is about a Medieval peasant named Tim who tries to become a knight.

 Once Upon A Tim (2022)
 Once Upon A Tim: The Labyrinth of Doom (2022)

References

American male writers
Screenwriters from Pennsylvania
1969 births
Living people